Kinver High School (formerly Edgecliff High School) is a mixed secondary school and sixth form located in Kinver in the English county of Staffordshire.

Previously a community school administered by Staffordshire County Council, Edgecliff High School converted to academy status in March 2015 and was renamed Kinver High School. The school is now sponsored by the Invictus Education Trust, but continues to coordinate with Staffordshire County Council for admissions

Notable former pupils
The members of indie rock band The Arcadian Kicks attended the school.

References

External links
Kinver High School official website

Secondary schools in Staffordshire
Academies in Staffordshire